Sidney Blanks (April 29, 1941 – December 12, 2021) was an American football player and the first-ever African American football player to play in the Lone Star Conference.

College career
A halfback, Blanks played college football at Texas A&I University. Blanks was an All-American member of the Texas A&I Javelinas from 1960 to 1963. He was inducted into the Texas A&I Hall of Fame in 1981. In 2002 he was inducted into the Lone Star Conference Hall of Fame.

Recruited by College Football Hall of Fame coach Gil Steinke in 1960, Blanks was the first African American to play in the Lone Star Conference. He was also the first African American to receive a football scholarship at an integrated school in the state of Texas.

Professional career
He played professionally in the American Football League for the Houston Oilers from 1964 through 1968. He also played for the Boston Patriots of the AFL in 1969, and the Patriots of the NFL in 1970.

Blanks was an AFL All-Star in 1964.

Personal life and death
To honor a “hero, legend and trailblazer,” the city of Del Rio named a park after Blanks near San Felipe Creek in 2015.

Blanks' son, Lance, is an analyst for ESPN, former NBA Executive and retired American professional basketball player who was selected by the Detroit Pistons in the first round of the 1990 NBA draft.

His granddaughter, Riley Blanks was a “four-star recruit” for the University of Virginia tennis team and is the Founder of Woke Beauty.

He died in Webster, Texas, on December 12, 2021, at the age of 80.

See also
List of American Football League players

References

1941 births
2021 deaths
People from Del Rio, Texas
Texas A&M–Kingsville Javelinas football players
Boston Patriots players
Houston Oilers players
American Football League All-Star players
American Football League players